Sumner may refer to:

Places

Antarctica
 Mount Sumner, a mountain in the Rare Range, Antarctica
 Sumner Glacier, southern Graham Land, Antarctica

Australia
 Sumner, Queensland, suburb of Brisbane

New Zealand
 Sumner, New Zealand, seaside suburb of Christchurch, New Zealand
 Lake Sumner

United States

Inhabited places
 Sumner, California, former name of Kern, California
 Sumner, Florida
 Sumner, Georgia
 Sumner, Illinois
 Sumner, Iowa
 Sumner, Maine
 Sumner, Michigan
 Sumner, Mississippi
 Sumner, Missouri
 Sumner, Nebraska
 Sumner, Oklahoma
 Sumner, Oregon
 Sumner, Portland, Oregon
 Sumner, Texas
 Sumner, Washington
 Sumner station, a train station in Sumner, Washington
 Sumner, Barron County, Wisconsin, a town
 Sumner (community), Barron County, Wisconsin, an unincorporated community
 Sumner, Jefferson County, Wisconsin, a town
 Sumner, Trempealeau County, Wisconsin, a town
 Sumner County, Kansas
 Sumner County, Tennessee
 Sumner Township, Michigan
 Sumner Township, Minnesota
 Fort Sumner, New Mexico
 Lake Sumner, New Mexico

Other places in the United States
 Sumner College, Oregon
 Sumner Elementary School, in Topeka, Kansas
 Sumner Strait, Alaska
 Sumner Tunnel, a vehicular tunnel in Boston, Massachusetts

People
 Sumner (given name)
 Sumner (surname)

In Music
 Sumner (band), An Australian R&B-inspired electronic duo

Ships
 SS Charles Sumner, a World War II Liberty ship
 USS Sumner, multiple ships

Other uses
 Archdeacon of Sumner, Anglican Diocese of Christchurch, Aotearoa, New Zealand and Polynesia
 Bank of Sumner, a historic building in Sumner, Iowa, United States
 Sumner (crater), a crater on the moon
 Sumner method, a way of finding a ship's location at sea
 Viscount Sumner, a title in the British peerage

See also
 Lord Sumner (disambiguation)
 Summer (disambiguation)
 Summoner (disambiguation)
 Sumner Township (disambiguation)
 Sumner, Wisconsin (disambiguation)
 Sumner County (disambiguation)
 Sumner High School (disambiguation)
 Sumner Hill (disambiguation)
 Sumner Township (disambiguation)